The Soule Canal is a historic failed irrigation canal in southwest Kansas meant to divert water from the Arkansas River.  Two segments near Ingalls, Kansas were listed on the National Register of Historic Places in 2014.

The canal ran from the east edge of Ingalls in Gray County, Kansas east to Spearville in adjacent Ford County.  The canal generally followed the line of the Arkansas River, the ATSF railway, and U.S. Highway 50/400.

It became known as Soule's Folly.

Notes

Buildings and structures in Gray County, Kansas
National Register of Historic Places in Gray County, Kansas